Shailendra Raj Mehta (born 9 July 1959) is an Indian economist who is specialized in Microeconomics theory, institution design, industrial organization, Information economics, Experimental economics, strategic management and Entrepreneurship. He was chairman of the Board of Management at Auro University. In 2017, he became the President and Director of MICA (institute), Ahmedabad.

In December 2020, the Ministry of Education, Government of India, appointed him as a member of the Mission High-Level Committee (MHLC) of the Indian Knowledge System.

Early life 
Mehta was born in Jodhpur, Rajasthan. He studied Bachelor of Arts from St. Stephen's College, Delhi. He did his Master of Arts from Delhi School of Economics followed by M. Phil from Balliol College, Oxford and PhD from Harvard University.

Career
From 1990 to 2006, he taught at the Krannert School of Management, Purdue University, first in Economics and later in Strategy. During this period, he also served as the Director of the Krannert School of Management's Entrepreneurship Initiative and of also of the SEAS Simulation Lab. He taught a wide range of courses to undergraduate, MBA, and Ph.D. students, including. He has been awarded one of Purdue University's highest awards, the Class of 1922 Award for Teaching, Innovation, and Helping Students Learn. While at Purdue, he co‐founded Simulex Inc., a high technology company in the Purdue Research Park. He continues to actively mentor and support startups.
After a 16-year stint at Purdue University, he returned to India in 2006–2007 to head the collaboration between Duke University's Corporate Education Arm, Duke CE, and Indian Institute of Management, Ahmedabad as its head for India, West Asia and the Middle East and simultaneously as visiting professor of Business Policy at IIM-Ahmedabad 
In 2012, Mehta published a comprehensive paper studying what made US institutions so markedly better than others in the world which was then featured worldwide. In 2014, he was appointed as the Provost and Vice-Chancellor of Ahmedabad University. In 2015, he was appointed as the chairman of the Board of Management at Auro University where he also served as Acting Vice-Chancellor and Distinguished Professor of Strategy.

Over the years, Mehta has consulted with and taught senior executives worldwide including executives from North America, Europe, Africa, and Asia (including CEOs in Pakistan). The companies that he has worked with at the CEO, CXO, or board-level include the Bajaj Group, Bharat Petroleum, Black Management Forum of South Africa, Eli Lilly, Genpact, Honeywell, IBM, Infosys, Lockheed Martin, Medtronic, Microsoft, P&G, Price Waterhouse Coopers, State Bank of India and the Tata Group, and many agencies of the Indian and US governments, among others. He has done numerous programs for civil servants, including senior IRS, IFS, and IAS officers (of which one was for all secretaries to the Government of India).
He has done extensive research in the areas of Entrepreneurship, Industrial Organization, Information Economics, and Experimental Economics. His research was the subject of a full‐length review by the Economist. His work on creating world-class universities has been discussed around the world and profiled in over ten languages including Chinese, Russian, French, German, and Arabic among others. 

In 2017, he became the President & Director of MICA (institute) and was also appointed as the Distinguished Professor of Innovation and Entrepreneurship. The Ministry of Education has appointed him as the vice-chairman of the Governing Body of the Indian Institute of Advanced Study (IIAS)

President and director of MICA  
Making MICA an ideas-driven institution by getting the best research, teaching, and outreach on board, he has exemplified the pedagogical change, by introducing project-based and simulation-based learning for the students.
As president, Mehta partnered the institute with management schools in the United States including Emory University, Michigan State University, Northwestern University, University of Southern California and with Chinese varsities.

He has also introduced project-based and simulation-based learning for the students.

References

External links

Harvard University alumni
1959 births
Living people
Indian chief executives
Krannert School of Management faculty
Alumni of Balliol College, Oxford
St. Stephen's College, Delhi alumni
Delhi School of Economics alumni